Spielfeld-Straß station is a border station on the Southern Railway and the line to Trieste in Straß in Steiermark, in southern Steiermark, Austria, near the border  between Austria and Slovenia. Next to the station building of the ÖBB, there is also an office staffed by Slovenian Railways (Slovenske železnice, SŽ), which calls the station Špilje.

Location 
The station is located in Spielfeld, on the right (south) bank of the Mur and is about 2.2 km from the national border and 4.5 km from the Slovenian border station of Šentilj. The town of Straß in Steiermark, which the station is partly named after, is located about two kilometres north of the station.
 
The station is located at line-km 257.9 of the Southern Railway (measured from Vienna) and at line-km 615 of the Spielfeld-Straß–Trieste railway (measured 
from Belgrade) and 263 above sea level. The station is also the starting point of the Radkersburg Railway, which runs to the east over the Mur Bridge to Bad Radkersburg.
 
All international trains stopped in Spielfeld-Straß for passport control and to change staff between 1918 and December 2007, when Slovenia joined the Schengen Agreement. Customs controls ended in May 2004.

Passenger services
The following national services run towards Graz and Bad Radkersburg (ÖBB):
 S-Bahn line S5 to Graz Hbf
 S-Bahn S51 to Bad Radkersburg
 REX (Regional-Express): Graz Hbf–Spielfeld-Straß(–Bad Radkersburg)
 
The following national service runs towards Maribor (SŽ):
 LP/LPV (Regional services): Spielfeld-Straß–Maribor(–Ruše/–Zidani Most)
 
The following international services operate:
 EuroCity Emona: Vienna–Ljubljana and return
 EuroCity Croatia: Vienna–Zagreb and return

Infrastructure 
In addition to the station building with a platform (platform 1), the station complex has two uncovered and comparatively narrow island platforms (2/3 and 4/5) with access via a pedestrian level-crossing that leads to a total of four passenger tracks. A fifth track serves as a freight track. The former customs building, which also housed the SŽ's premises, was demolished between 2012 and 2015. Another historical building at the northern end of platform 1 was restored as a replacement for SŽ staff. 
 
There is a Park and ride facility at the station with parking spaces for 80 cars, 10 motorbikes and 50 bicycles.
 
In the station there is a ticket machine, a waiting room and public toilets. The station is only partially accessible for the handicapped.
 
The railway line has been single-track between Leibnitz and Maribor since reparations were paid to the Soviet Union at the end of the Second World War.

Electrification system 
The line between Graz and Spielfeld-Straß was electrified in May 1972. The line across the national border to Maribor was electrified in May 1977. The overhead line system complies with Austrian standards. The system separation points between the Austrian network electrified at 15 kV 16.7 Hz AC and the Slovenian network electrified at 3 kV DC are located in Spielfeld-Straß station.

References

Railway stations opened in 1848
1848 establishments in the Austrian Empire
Railway stations in Styria
Railway stations in Austria opened in 1848
Railway stations in Austria opened in the 19th century